Eutrachelophis bassleri is a species of snake in the family Colubridae. The species is found in Peru and Ecuador.

References

Eutrachelophis
Reptiles of Peru
Reptiles of Ecuador
Reptiles described in 2014